Majid Shahriari (c. 1966 – 29 November 2010) was a top Iranian nuclear scientist and physicist who worked with the Atomic Energy Organization of Iran.

Career
He specialized in neutron transport, a phenomenon that lies at the heart of nuclear chain reactions in reactors and bombs. According to The Guardian, he "had no known links to banned nuclear work". According to Al Jazeera he "was a quantum physicist and was not a political figure at all" and he "was not involved in Iran's nuclear programme".

He was also one of the two Iranian scientists of the International Centre for Synchrotron-Light for Experimental Science Applications in the Middle East, beside Masoud Alimohammadi, another assassinated scientist.

According to Time magazine, Majid Shahriari and Aria Tahami were "Chief Nuclear Scientists of Iran's nuclear program".

Some Iranian media reports said he taught at the Supreme National Defense University, which is run by the Iranian Army, according to The New York Times.

Assassination

On 29 November 2010, assassins riding motorcycles planted and detonated C-4 (explosive) on his car door whilst he was driving. He was instantly killed. His fellow nuclear scientist Fereydoon Abbasi, a professor at Shahid Beheshti University was severely wounded. Dr. Abbasi's wife was also hurt. The killers had attached bombs to the professors' cars and detonated them from a distance.

Iranian officials have variously blamed Israel and the United States for assassinating Shahriari. Saeed Jalili, Iran's chief nuclear negotiator, was quoted as saying Western nations "exercise terrorism to liquidate Iran's nuclear scientists".

Time magazine ran an article questioning whether this action was perpetrated by Mossad (Israel's external intelligence service). According to The Daily Telegraph (UK), Israel allegedly planned to conduct covert operations against Iran, including assassinations.

A Tehran nuclear site was officially renamed after him after his assassination.

See also

Assassination of Iranian nuclear scientists
Ardeshir Hosseinpour
Masoud Alimohammadi
Fereydoon Abbasi
Daryoush Rezaei
Mostafa Ahmadi-Roshan

References

Date of birth unknown
2010 deaths
People from Zanjan, Iran
Iranian physicists
Deaths by car bomb in Iran
Iranian murder victims
Year of birth uncertain
1966 births
People killed in Mossad operations
Iran–Israel proxy conflict